Erik Sokoy (born on September 13, 1994) is an Indonesian professional footballer who plays as a right back for Liga 1 club PS Barito Putera.

References

External links
 Erik Sokoy at Soccerway
 Erik Sokoy at Liga Indonesia

1994 births
Living people
People from Jayapura
Indonesian footballers
Papuan sportspeople
Liga 1 (Indonesia) players
Persidafon Dafonsoro players
PS Barito Putera players
Association football defenders